= Paignton Windmill =

Ruined windmill in Devon, England

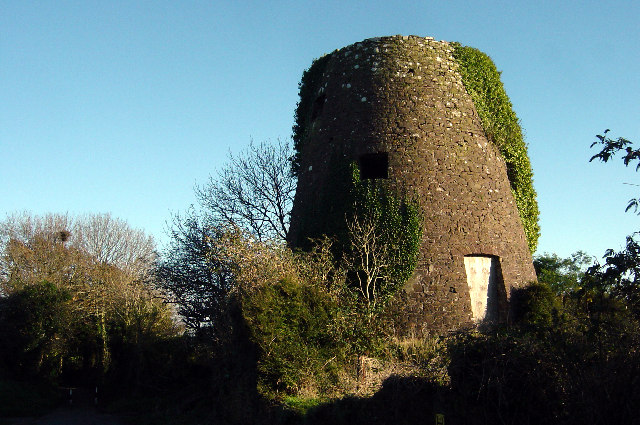

- Location within Devon
- Alternative names: Fernicombe Windmill

General information
- Status: Partly ruinous
- Type: Windmill
- Location: Windmill Lane, Paignton, Devon, England
- Coordinates: 50.450080°N 3.584628°W

Technical details
- Material: Purple limestone rubble, local breccia
- Size: 4 storeys

Design and construction
- Designations: Grade II

Paignton Windmill, also known as Fernicombe Windmill, is a late 18th-century windmill situated on the outskirts of the town of Paignton, Devon, England. It is a Grade II Listed Building, and lies in a partially ruinous state.
